Samuel St. George Rogers (June 30, 1832 – September 11, 1880) was a solicitor, an officer in the Confederate Army, a Confederate politician who served in the Confederate States Congress during the American Civil War. He also represented Florida in the Second Confederate Congress from 1864 to 1865.

Biography
Rogers was born in Giles County, Tennessee. He served in the Florida Senate in 1860. He also represented Florida in the Second Confederate Congress from 1864 to 1865.

References

External links
Bio at PoliticalGraveyard.com

1832 births
1880 deaths
Florida state senators
Members of the Confederate House of Representatives from Florida
19th-century American politicians
People from Giles County, Tennessee